They Conquer the Skies is a 1963 Soviet drama film directed by Tatyana Lioznova.

Plot 
The film tells about a pilot named Alexei Kolchin, who had the honor of being the first to launch a jet plane and test him. The first launch was excellent, but during the modernization of the aircraft, the engine exploded, causing Alexei to die. His friend Sergey Sharov, based on the recommendations of Alexey, makes the second launch...

Cast 
 Nikolay Rybnikov as Kolchin
 Vladimir Sedov as Sharov
 Svetlana Svetlichnaya as Nina Kolchina
 Yevgeny Yevstigneev as Main designer
 Oleg Zhakov as Basargin
 Lev Barashkov as The undisciplined pilot discharged of flight tests.
 Sergei Blinnikov
 Georgiy Kulikov

References

External links 
 

1963 films
1960s Russian-language films
Soviet drama films
1963 drama films